Phtheochroa noema is a species of moth of the family Tortricidae. It lives in Jalisco, Mexico.

References

Moths described in 1991
Phtheochroa